These are the results for the boys' individual event at the 2018 Summer Youth Olympics.

Results

References

 Fencing ranking round Results
 Swimming  Results
 Fencing bonus round Results
 Laser-run Results
 Total Results

Modern pentathlon at the 2018 Summer Youth Olympics